Cottonwood Creek is a stream in Lafayette County in the U.S. state of Missouri. It is a tributary of Little Tabo Creek.

Cottonwood Creek was named for the cottonwood timber near its course.

See also
List of rivers of Missouri

References

Rivers of Lafayette County, Missouri
Rivers of Missouri